D.G. Smalling is an Oklahoma Choctaw Native artist. Smalling is best known for his one-line, continuous drawing technique in which his pen never leaves the paper until the image is complete. Although Smalling rarely enters competitive shows, he was among a select group of artists who represented Oklahoma at Disney's Epcot Center in 2007. He participated in Choctaw Days at the National Museum of the American Indian in 2012 where he presented on World War I Choctaw code talkers, including his great-grandfather, Calvin Wilson.

Early life
Smalling grew up in Idabel and Haworth, but then at age 8, he and his family packed up and left southeastern Oklahoma to do missionary work overseas. Together, they lived in Switzerland, Cameroon, and South Africa, where he was continually influenced both politically and artistically by his travels and exposure to other cultures. Smalling had always been exposed to some form of art during his childhood, but the influence in Europe was marked. Smalling recalls this time as "pivotal" in his artistic development. 
 
when I left Haworth and I left the United States and went to Switzerland... we had art every day. We had poetry every day. I was in third or fourth grade and immediately learning how to memorize Robert Frost, and painting and sculpting. It was incredible. I think that year was the most pivotal year of my life.

Education
After graduating high school in South Africa, while his parents continued their missionary work in numerous countries around the world, Smalling returned to the United States to attend the University of Oklahoma where he earned his degree in political science.

Collections
"Every piece I create, regardless of scale, is one continuous line," said Smalling. "My work has evolved into an exercise of contemporary Southeastern 'neo-hieroglyphics,' the re-approach to hieroglyphic art of my Choctaw heritage, in a modern way, in terms of materials, techniques and subjects. The subjects I depict are rarely historical because I want to describe life today."

Smalling, painting and drawing does not depict subjects that are dark, cynical, or macabre.

Smalling's art has been portrayed in several exhibitions, including featured artist at Epcot Disney World: State of Oklahoma Centennial Show in 2007, Grand Palais "Salon du Dessin et de la Peinture á l'Eau" in Paris, France in 2011 and National Museum of the American Indian "Choctaw Codetalkers Celebration" in Washington, DC in 2012. In addition, Smalling has been commissioned to paint several portraits, including U.S. Justice Sandra Day O'Connor, U.S. Congressman Tom Cole, U.S. Deputy Attorney General James Cole, T. Boone Pickens, Sir Tony Blair former Prime Minister of the UK, Baroness Emma Nicholson of Winterbourne, among many other notable dignitaries.

Buffalo

The Buffalo Series are a collection of line drawings representing central plains buffalo in the United States. Smalling incorporates his signature 'single-line' style in rendering the abstract form of the animal. He then fills in the empty space with color.

Fancy Shawl Dancers

The Fancy Shawl Dancers collection is one of Smallings most fluid representations of the human body.

Pony Moon

The Pony Moon series represents a beautiful and abstract presentation of the artist's perspective of central plains horses illuminated against ambient light.

References

External links
  Oklahoma Native Artists Oral History Project -- OSU Library
  Operation Lady Justice -- USDOJ

1975 births
Living people
Choctaw people
Native American artists
20th-century Native Americans
21st-century Native Americans